Dennis Hatcher is an Australian former rower. He was an Australian national champion and won a bronze medal at the 1978 World Rowing Championships in the lightweight division.

Club and state rowing
Raised in Adelaide, Hatcher's senior rowing was from the Adelaide University Boat Club and later the Mercantile Rowing Club in Melbourne.

State representation first came for Hatcher in 1973 in the South Australian men's heavyweight eight contesting the King's Cup at the Interstate Regatta within the Australian Rowing Championships. He rowed in two further South Australian King's Cup eights in 1976 and 1977 and stroked both those crews.

In 1974 and 1976 Hatcher rowed in Adelaide University eights at the Australian Intervarsity Championships. The 1974 crew won the championship title.

By 1979 Hatcher was rowing from the Mercantile Rowing Club as a lightweight and was selected to the Victorian lightweight four who contested and won the Penrith Cup at the 1979 Interstate Regatta. In an MUBC crew he won the lightweight eight national title in 1979.

International representative rowing
Hatcher made his Australian representative debut at the 1978 World Rowing Championships in Copenhagen in the Australian men's lightweight eight. That crew won a bronze medal.

For the 1979 in Bled, Hatcher was again in the Australian lightweight eight which finished in overall sixth place.

Rowing selector
Hatcher was a selector for Australian representative squads for six World Rowing Championships from 1989 to 1994 and for the 1992 Summer Olympics. Most notably, his involvement in the selection of the Oarsome Foursome rowing team for the 1990 World Rowing Championships along with coach Noel Donaldson and other national selectors.

References

  

Living people
Australian male rowers
World Rowing Championships medalists for Australia
Year of birth missing (living people)
20th-century Australian people